John Casper Stoever Log House is a historic home located at New Holland, Lancaster County, Pennsylvania. It was built about 1740, and is a -story, 36 feet 6 inches by 22 feet, log dwelling.  It has corner posts, to which the logs are attached with mortise and tenon joints.  It had a gable roof with dormers and sat on a stone foundation.  The log structure was covered with asbestos shingles over novelty siding.  A one-story, rear addition was built in the 1880s and a glass entryway in the 1920s.  Its builder, Rev. John Casper Stoever (1707–1779), was a prominent figure in the development of the Lutheran church.

The house is no longer located at 200 W. Main St., and appears to have been moved about 30 feet south and turned 90 degrees.

It was listed on the National Register of Historic Places in 1987.

References

Houses on the National Register of Historic Places in Pennsylvania
Houses completed in 1740
Houses in Lancaster County, Pennsylvania
National Register of Historic Places in Lancaster County, Pennsylvania
New Holland, Pennsylvania